The 2002–03 Midland Football Alliance season was the ninth in the history of Midland Football Alliance, a football competition in England.

Clubs and league table
The league featured 20 clubs from the previous season, along with two new clubs:
Causeway United, promoted from the West Midlands (Regional) League
Grosvenor Park, promoted from the Midland Football Combination

Also, Knypersley Victoria changed name to Biddulph Victoria, Studley B K L changed name to Studley.

League table

References

External links
 Midland Football Alliance

2002–03
8